Murat Kalikulov (born August 19, 1978 in Tashkent) is an Uzbek judoka, who competed in the men's half-lightweight category. He held the 2004 Uzbek senior title in his own division, picked up five medals in his career, including a silver from the 2001 Summer Universiade in Beijing, and represented his nation Uzbekistan in the 66-kg class at the 2004 Summer Olympics.

Kalikulov emerged himself into the international scene at the 2001 Summer Universiade in Beijing, where he earned a silver medal in the 66-kg division, losing the final match to Russia's Magomed Dzhafarov by ippon.

At the 2004 Summer Olympics in Athens, Kalikulov qualified for the Uzbek squad in the men's half-lightweight class (66 kg), by placing third and receiving a berth from the Asian Championships in Almaty, Kazakhstan. He lost his opening match to Serbia and Montenegro's Miloš Mijalković, who scored more points on waza-ari and koka for a victory and threw him down the tatami with an obitori gaeshi (belt-grab throw) throughout the five-minute limit.

References

External links

1978 births
Living people
Uzbekistani male judoka
Olympic judoka of Uzbekistan
Judoka at the 2004 Summer Olympics
Sportspeople from Tashkent
Universiade medalists in judo
Universiade silver medalists for Uzbekistan